Suriname is a South Korean streaming television series directed and co-written by Yoon Jong-bin, and starring Ha Jung-woo, Hwang Jung-min, Park Hae-soo, Jo Woo-jin Yoo Yeon-seok and Nubel Feliz Yan. Based on true events, the series depicts an ordinary entrepreneur who has no choice but to risk his life in joining the secret mission of government agents to capture a South Korean drug lord operating in Suriname. It was released on September 9, 2022 on Netflix, alongside an English language dub renamed Narco-Saints, in order to draw similarities to Netflix's previous similarly-premised series Narcos (2015–2017) and Narcos: Mexico (2018–2021), the "play next" of the latter series linking to Narco-Saints.

Synopsis 
The life-threatening journey of Kang In-gu (Ha Jung-woo), a civilian businessman who has no choice but to cooperate with the secret operation of the National Intelligence Service to catch Jeon Yo-hwan (Hwang Jung-min), a South Korean drug lord who has taken control of Suriname.

Cast

Main 
 Ha Jung-woo as Kang In-gu
 A businessman who arrived in Suriname for skate business, only to be forcefully pulled in by the National Intelligence Service for a secret operation to catch Yo-hwan.
 Hwang Jung-min as Jeon Yo-hwan
 A Korean drug lord currently based in Suriname, moonlighting as a pastor.
 Park Hae-soo as Choi Chang-ho
 The team leader of the National Intelligence Service's Branch in the Americas.
 Jo Woo-jin as Byeon Ki-tae
 The right-hand man of Yo-hwan; he was formerly under the Chinese organisation before betraying to work for Yo-hwan.
 Yoo Yeon-seok as David Julio Park
 The consultant lawyer for Yo-hwan.

Supporting 
 Kim Min-gwi as Lee Sang-jun 
 A deacon and close aide of Yo-hwan.
 Choo Ja-hyun as Park Hye-jin 
 In-gu's wife.
 Chang Chen as Chen Zhen 
 A Chinese gang leader based in Chinatown, Paramaribo.
 Jordan Preston as President Delano Alvarez
 The President of Suriname who came to power after conducting a military coup with the help of Yo-hwan.
Bryan Larkin as DEA Chief
 He works closely with Chang-ho to arrest Yo-hwan.
 Lee Bong-ryun as Deaconess Jung
 Yo-hwan's church figure, she is cruel like him.
 Go Geon-han as Dong-woo 
 Member of the National Intelligence Service and Chang-ho's assistant.
 Hyun Bong-sik as Park Eung-soo 
 In-gu's high school friend and a sailor, he suggested that In-gu goes to Suriname for skate business.
 Kim Ye-won as Jeon Yo-hwan's wife 
 In 1993, at a investment briefing headed by Yo-hwan, she disclosed false information regarding Yo-hwan having connections to the president to millionaires.
 Kim Si-hyeon as Si-hyeon 
 Chang-ho's assistant.

 Chidi Ajufo as Gallas

 Anupam Tripathi as a soldier of the Surinamese Army 
Song Ho-bum as Chen Zhen's underling
 Lee Sung-min as The voice of a fishing boat captain

 Nubel Feliz Yan as Nubel The Mercenary 2

Episodes

Production

Casting 
On March 23, 2021, the cast of K-drama Suriname, inspired by Netflix's Narcos, was announced to include Jo Woo-jin, Yoo Yeon-seok, Park Hae-soo, and Choo Ja-hyun, in addition to Ha Jung-woo and Hwang Jung-min, who had already been confirmed as the lead roles. The first script reading of the cast was held on March 22, 2021, at a location in Seoul.

Filming 
Production of Suriname planned to be filmed at Dominican Republic from April last year, due to COVID-19 pandemic, the production was postponed indefinitely. Later, production started filming on a set in South Korea from last April and decided to shoot in Dominican Republic, not in Suriname, for about two months starting in November.

On November 9, 2021, it was reported that actors and staffs of Suriname departed to Dominican Republic from the end of October and plans return to Korea in mid-December. Yoo Yeon-seok recently returned to Korea in the end of October, Hwang Jung-min and Ha Jung-woo departed to Dominican Republic in late October and early November. Jo Woo-jin is scheduled to leave the country soon. This story background location will not resemble the Surinamese country.

Controversy 
Suriname's government has taken legal action against the production company for allegedly damaging Suriname's image by featuring drugs in Narco - Saints. Suriname's government, which takes legal action with just one drama, also said it would lodge a protest with the South Korean government. Specifically, Narco - Saints  showed a corrupt president, as well as a drug scene. However, as national issues made a choice.

On September 13, 2022 (local time), the Minister of Foreign Affairs of Suriname expressed his displeasure about the Netflix original series Suriname, saying, “Suriname has been portrayed as a drug-transfer country for many years. We are working to improve the image. But we are at a disadvantage again with Netflix's 'Suriname' isn't just foreshadowing legal action against producers." He also announced that he would send an anti-job protest letter to the US ambassador in Suriname. A senior government official in Suriname went public about the job and expressed his discomfort. The interest in Netflix's response was consolidated. Later, Ahn Eun-joo, deputy spokesperson for the Ministry of Foreign Affairs announced "If there is a misunderstanding, try to resolve it". In the end, it even showed signs of turning into a diplomatic issue. The Embassy of South Korea in Venezuela asserted that it was concerned about the safety of local residents in Suriname.

Accolades

References

External links 
 
 
 

2022 South Korean television series debuts
Korean-language Netflix original programming
South Korean drama web series
South Korean web series
2022 web series debuts
South Korean crime television series
South Korean thriller television series
Television series based on actual events
Television shows set in Suriname
Television shows filmed in the Dominican Republic
Television series set in 2009
National Intelligence Service (South Korea) in fiction
Drug Enforcement Administration in fiction